Zele (Zelle, Jere, Jera) is an East Kainji language of Bassa LGA in northern Plateau State, Nigeria.

References

Blench, Roger. 2010. Plural verbs in the languages of Central Nigeria.

East Kainji languages
Languages of Nigeria